I Am What I Am is the second extended play by English hip hop and R&B musical recording artist Mark Morrison. It was released in the United Kingdom on MackLife Records on 7 July 2014. The EP has received mixed to positive reviews from critics.

Background
Recording started in 2010, and the EP was also first announced in 2010.

A music video for N.A.N.G. 2.0 was uploaded to YouTube on 21 October 2013 at a total of four minutes and 9 seconds. To coincide with the songs and video theme, it was released in October, which is National Domestic Violence Awareness Month (in United States). The video was premiered by KarenCivil.com.

A music video for the title track I Am What I Am was uploaded to YouTube on 12 May 2014 at a total of two minutes and 54 seconds. The video premiered on Vice Noisey.

Reception

Musiceyz.co.uk wrote "Mark's voice is heavily treated making him sound a bit too synthed and computerized." Jonny Abrams of Rocksucker gave a negative review of I Am What I Am, feeling that "It might have gotten away with it had the song itself not been so listless", naming it one of the week's worst singles.

"I Am What I Am" (Mark Sparks Remix), which featured American rapper and Slaughterhouse member Crooked I, debuted on the SingersRoom.com website on 16 May 2013. It became the number 1 most played single that week, on the website's IndieRotation Singles Chart. The song was supported by Vibe, who added it to their V-Playlist and reviewed the track saying "It's been a while since we've heard from Mr. Morrison. However, his new soulful track has been worth the wait". DJBooth.net rated the Mark Sparks remix of "I Am What I Am" 4 out of 5 stars, with a positive review calling it an "anthemic cut, expanding the original’s aural palette with 808s, swirling synths and a brand new chopped-n-screwed outro". DJ Blaze of DJBooth also commented "This beat by Mark Sparks is tough and Mark Morrison ripped this. Good feature by Crooked I. Banger!"

Track listing
All tracks written by Mark Morrison.

References

2014 EPs
Mark Morrison albums